Leucochloron minarum is a species of flowering in the family Fabaceae. It is found only in Brazil.

References

Mimosoids
Flora of Brazil
Data deficient plants
Taxonomy articles created by Polbot